The 2018 Tasmanian state election was held on 3 March 2018 to elect all 25 members of the Tasmanian House of Assembly.

The four-year incumbent Liberal government, led by Premier Will Hodgman, won a second consecutive term. It defeated the Labor Party, led by Opposition Leader Rebecca White, and the Greens, led by Cassy O'Connor. The Jacqui Lambie Network also competed in a state election for the first time, though the party did not win any seats and its leader Jacqui Lambie did not stand for election.

The Tasmanian House of Assembly (the lower house) has five divisions with five members each for a total of 25 seats, 13 of which are required for a majority. The divisions correspond in name and boundaries to the five federal electorates for the House of Representatives. The election was conducted by the Tasmanian Electoral Commission using the Hare-Clark electoral system; five candidate are declared elected once each of them reach 16.7% (one-sixth) of the total formal vote during counting.

House of Assembly elections are not tied to the election dates for the Legislative Council (the upper house), which occur in May each year for two or three of the 15 divisions, completing a fixed periodic cycle over six years.

Ultimately, the Liberals suffered a two-seat swing, but were able to hold on to a one-seat majority of 13 seats. It was the first time in 22 years that a Liberal government won a second consecutive term in Tasmania, and the first time since 1986 and only the second time since 1931 that an incumbent conservative government was reelected with an overall majority. It was also the first time a state parliamentary assembly in Australia elected a majority of female members, with thirteen women and twelve men.

Results

Primary vote percentages by division

Current distribution of seats

Date
Under section 23 of the Constitution Act 1934, terms in the Tasmanian House of Assembly end a maximum of four years from the return of the writs following the previous election, in this case 29 March 2014. The election date is not fixed and can be called at any time with the agreement of the Governor of Tasmania, representing the Crown. The Electoral Act 2004 governs the process of requesting elections. The Governor may then issue writs between five and ten days after the Premier of Tasmania requests an election. Candidate nominations must close on a date seven to 21 days after the issuance of the Governor's writ, and polling day must be a Saturday between 15 and 30 days after candidate nominations close. Accordingly, if the lower house had run to its maximum term in 2018, then the Saturday election date would have been between 28 April and 19 May inclusive. However, on 28 January 2018, Premier Will Hodgman visited the Governor to request issue of writs for an election on 3 March 2018.

Background

The results of the previous election saw a substantial swing to the Liberal Party led by Will Hodgman, defeating the then Labor government led by Lara Giddings, which had governed in majority together with the Greens until shortly before the election. The 2014 election saw the Labor party reduced to seven seats and the Greens reduced to three seats in the Assembly.

Following the loss, Giddings resigned as leader of the Labor Party and was replaced by then opposition Deputy Premier Bryan Green. He subsequently resigned from opposition leadership on 17 March 2017, and Rebecca White was elected Labor leader unopposed. Aside from the Liberals, Labor and Greens, the Jacqui Lambie Network, formed in 2015, fielded several candidates in 2018 and was considered a chance to pick up seats, although they failed to do so. The two other minor parties contesting the 2018 election were the Shooters, Fishers and Farmers Party and the newly formed T4T – Tasmanians 4 Tasmania.

Campaign
With polls showing that the Greens and Jacqui Lambie Network were polling well, there was speculation that the Liberals could lose their majority. Nonetheless, Hodgman was adamant that he would only govern if the Liberals retained their majority, saying, "We will govern alone or not at all."

The Labor party ran on a policy that claimed it would make Tasmania the first state in the country to remove poker machines from pubs and clubs. During the 2018 campaign Federal Group, the largest operator of gaming venues in Tasmania, admitted to supporting its employees campaigning on a pro-pokie platform. Opposition Labor Leader Rebecca White claimed the Liberal Party outspent the Labor election campaign by a factor of 5 to 1.

Whilst the disclosure of political donations in Tasmania is required annually, and donations below $13,000 don't have to be reported, there were widespread calls for greater transparency in campaign spending in the lead up to the 2018 election. Federal Group had no applicable disclosed donations to the Tasmanian Liberal Party in the applicable yearly period prior to the election (2016–2017). However more recent donations prior to the election date are not required to be disclosed by the Australian Electoral Commission until FYE 2017–18. These disclosures showed that the gambling industry donated over $400,000 to the Liberal Party.

On the day before the election, 2 March 2018, it was revealed that the Liberal Party had tried to push through a plan to soften the state's gun laws, to benefit farm workers and sporting shooters.

Retiring MPs

Liberal
Matthew Groom (Denison) – announced retirement 23 September 2017

Labor
Lara Giddings (Franklin) – announced retirement 14 May 2017
David Llewellyn (Lyons) – announced retirement 15 May 2017

Polling
Polling is regularly conducted for Tasmanian state politics by Enterprise Marketing and Research Services (EMRS). The sample size for each EMRS poll is 1,000 Tasmanian voters. Polling is also conducted irregularly by MediaReach, ReachTEL and Roy Morgan Research, the latter with sample sizes of typically a few hundred voters. The sample size for ReachTEL's 24 February 2018 poll was 3,179.

Graphical summary

See also
Candidates of the 2018 Tasmanian state election

References

External links
 Tasmanian Electoral Commission: State Election 2018
 ABC Elections: 2018 Tasmanian election
 EMRS Tasmanian state polling

Elections in Tasmania
2018 elections in Australia
2010s in Tasmania